Secrets of the Heart is the debut studio album by American R&B singer Lisa Taylor released in 1992 by Giant Records and Warner Bros. Records. The album is a pop, R&B, and contemporary gospel record. It was primarily produced by Robert Brookins and Sami McKinney. "Secrets of the Heart" was issued as the first single in March 1992, reaching #41 on the Billboard R&B Chart. "Did You Pray Today" was released in June, reaching #40.

Background 
Taylor recorded songs with producer Sam McKinney, Robert Brookins, and Randy Cantor.  McKinney and Taylor shopped her demos and signed a deal with Giant Records, Irving Azoff's new label, distributed by Warner Bros.

Music video 
Taylor's music video for "Secrets of the Heart" was in rotation at BET and Record Guide's Street Beat, New Jersey, among a sampling of National Video Music Outlets.

Critical reception 
Cashbox wrote "a variety of music raging from gospel to Top 40" giving her album "a universal sound that should pay off in the end."

Track listing

Singles

References 

1992 debut albums
Giant Records (Warner) albums